Las Vegas Motor Speedway, located in Clark County, Nevada in Las Vegas, Nevada about  northeast of the Las Vegas Strip, is a  complex of multiple tracks for motorsports racing. The complex is owned by Speedway Motorsports, Inc., which is headquartered in Charlotte, North Carolina.

History

Following the final closure of Stardust International Raceway in 1971, plans were developed for a new racing facility in Las Vegas: the Las Vegas Speedrome. Located in the far northeast corner of the Las Vegas Valley, the Speedrome consisted of a road course and drag strip, opening in 1972. Alexander Rodriguez leased the facility from the City of Las Vegas, and added the 3/8-mile short track in 1985 after the closure of Craig Road Speedway in 1983. Ralph Engelstad of the Imperial Palace purchased the track in 1989, renaming the facility Las Vegas Speedway Park. Engelstad partnered with William Bennett of the Sahara Hotel and opened a new $72 million superspeedway on the site in September 1996. The first race at the speedway was on September 15 with an IndyCar event, which was won by Richie Hearn.  A NASCAR Truck Series race followed in November.  In December 1998, Speedway Motorsports purchased Las Vegas Motor Speedway from Engelstad and Bennett for $215 million. Veteran motorsports publicist Chris Powell was named the speedway's president and general manager and still holds that position today.

The Winston No Bull 5 Million Dollar Bonus was held at the track from 1999 to 2002. Jeff Burton won a million dollars in 2000 and Jeff Gordon won the bonus in 2001. The drag strip was relocated into the current The Strip at Las Vegas Motor Speedway, while the old drag strip and road course was rebuilt to the current outer 2.4 mile road course in use today. The 3/8-mile oval was rebuilt with a new pit lane and start-finish changed to the opposite side. During the 2004 and 2005 seasons, Champ Car also held races at the speedway, which were both won by Sébastien Bourdais.

In 2006, plans were announced to reconfigure the track after the Nextel Cup Series race held in March, increasing the banking from the original 12 degrees to 20 degrees. This reconfiguration entailed "progressive banking" which increases the degree of banking on a gradient towards the outside of the track. This increased side-by-side racing. The speedway also constructed a fan zone called the "Neon Garage". This area has live entertainment, unprecedented access to the drivers and teams, such as viewing areas for fans to watch their favorite driver's car get worked on and talk to the drivers, and is home to the Winner's Circle. The speedway moved pit road  closer to the grandstands, built a new media center and added a quarter-mile oval for Legends Cars, Bandoleros, and Thunder Roadsters, in the tri-oval area.

On August 8, 2006, the newly reconfigured track reopened to stock cars. Kurt Busch, the 2004 NASCAR Cup Series Champion and Las Vegas native, became the first NASCAR Cup Series driver to test a stock car on the newly reconfigured track in his No. 2 Penske Dodge. The Truck Series race in September 2006 was the first NASCAR race run on the surface, with Mike Skinner being victorious. Jeff Burton won the first Busch Series race on the new surface in March 2007, taking a Monte Carlo SS to Victory Lane.  The following day, Jimmie Johnson drove a Chevrolet to Victory Lane, capturing the first NASCAR Cup Series win on the new pavement, and for him the third straight year he drove to victory lane at Vegas.

In March 2011, Insomniac Events announced that their largest rave festival in North America, Electric Daisy Carnival (EDC), would take place at Las Vegas Motor Speedway for the first time on June 24–26. More than 235,000 people attended the three-day event. The 2012 event was held June 8–10 with an attendance of 315,000 people. The 2013 event was held June 21–23 with an attendance of approximately 345,000 people. The 2014 event was held on June 20–22, and the 2015 event took place June 19–21. The twentieth anniversary EDC Las Vegas 2016 took place June 17–19, 2016; the most recent edition ran from May 17–19, 2019; and the event was to have returned May 15–17, 2020, but was ultimately canceled because of the COVID-19 pandemic. Insomniac signed a ten-year contract with LVMS to host EDC through 2022.

A third road course designed by Romain Thievin was added in 2012.

In late 2017, the drag strip was expanded to four lanes. Since 2018, NHRA's April meeting is held with four cars racing simultaneously.

Starting in 2018, a second race weekend was initiated at the track, taking the New Hampshire Motor Speedway's Cup Series and Truck Series fall weekend races.  Also, both weekends will now be triple headers (Cup, Truck, and Xfinity Series), moving the October stand alone race for the Truck Series at LVMS to the spring weekend, and moving the stand-alone Xfinity race from the Kentucky Speedway to the fall weekend. The Cup race would be the first race for the playoffs (replacing Chicagoland Speedway), The regular season finale for Xfinity Series, and the second playoff race for the Truck Series.

Because of the COVID-19 pandemic, the NHRA cancelled both races (the four and two lane meetings) and moved the NHRA World Finals, which had been held at Auto Club Raceway at Pomona, to the drag strip.  (The World Finals is a different race than the NHRA fall race meeting legally.)

2011 IndyCar accident
On October 16, 2011, the final race of the 2011 IndyCar season, the IZOD IndyCar World Championship, was held at Las Vegas. However, the race was halted by a crash on lap 11 that involved 15 cars, some of which became airborne, and some of which burst into flames. The crash began when Wade Cunningham made light contact with James Hinchcliffe, but the situation turned into a big pile-up of cars. The crash forced the red flag to be waved almost instantly, due to the remains of the damaged cars and the amount of debris on the track.

Four of the 15 drivers were seriously injured and taken to the nearby University Medical Center for treatment, one of which was two-time, reigning Indianapolis 500 winner and 2005 series champion Dan Wheldon, who suffered severe blunt force trauma to the head after his car flew into the catch fence. He was pronounced dead on arrival two hours later and IndyCar's officials formally decided to abandon the race. Instead of completing the race with 188 laps to go, the 19 drivers who were not involved went back out on the track and did a five-lap salute in Wheldon's honor.

In December 2011, IndyCar announced that they would not return to Las Vegas Motor Speedway and that the future of IndyCar depended on what they would learn from the ongoing investigation of the crash that claimed Wheldon's life.

The crash happened during the filming of an episode about IndyCar for the TV documentary series Nerve Center. The crash was shown in the episode.

In 2022, IndyCar returned to Las Vegas Motor Speedway to promote a new annual race, the Indy Autonomous Challenge held during the Consumer Electronics Show in Las Vegas.  The race has been held on the oval with autonomous cars.

Records
 NASCAR Cup Series Qualifying: Kurt Busch, 27.498 s (196.378 mph), March 4, 2016
 NASCAR Cup Series Race: Brad Keselowski, 2 h 35 min 24 s (154.633 mph), 2014 Kobalt 400
 NASCAR Xfinity Series Qualifying: Greg Biffle, 28.830 s (192.300 mph), October 25, 2003
 NASCAR Xfinity Series Race: Jeff Burton, 2 h 13 min 13 s (135.118 mph), 2000
 NASCAR Truck Series Qualifying: Kyle Busch, 30.184 s (178.903 mph), 2019
 NASCAR Truck Series Race: David Starr, 1 h 37 min 3 s (135.394 mph), 2002

Lap Records 
The fastest official race lap records at Las Vegas Motor Speedway are listed as:

NASCAR Cup Series records
(As of March 7, 2022)

* from minimum 5 starts.

Tracks

 Inside Road Course: , with a  road configuration and a  oval configuration
 Outside Road Course: several configurations with a maximum length of 
 The Bullring:  paved oval
 Dirt Track:  clay oval
 The Strip: /(402 m) drag strip
 Dream Racing Course:  road course, with a  configuration
 Off-road Course: an  area which may accommodate multiple configurations

Speedway track length
This length was also used by IRL between 1996 and 2000. This is the result of the reconfiguration of the track. Between 2005 (old layout) and 2011 (new layout), no Indycar race was held there. NASCAR still use the old length of exactly  for the reconfigured oval.

Other events
 The USAC Silver Crown Series had the 1997 season finale at the Dirt Track, won by Tony Stewart.
 The RE/MAX World Long Drive Championship was held here in December 2013. Tim Burke won the event.
 The track served as the Finish Line for the 24th season of The Amazing Race broadcast on May 18, 2014. Dave and Connor O'Leary won the Race.
 World of Outlaws first visited the Dirt Track in November 1996. It hosted both a spring and fall event from 1997 to 2006. later, the WoO had an annual spring event from 2009 to 2019. The track record was set by Danny Lasoski in March 2004, with 13.719 seconds.
 Red Bull Air Race World Championship visited the speedway in 2014 and 2015. The 2016 event was cancelled due to bad weather conditions. The 2017 event was postponed due to declining attendance and general apathy.
 Electric Daisy Carnival (EDC), an electronic music festival hosted by Insomniac Events has been held at the speedway every year since 2011.
 The NASCAR K&N Pro Series West raced at the Dirt Track in 2018 and 2019. Since 2020, the 2020 ARCA Menards Series West has raced at the Bullring.
 Formula D had an event here from 2009 to 2012.
 In 2020, high school seniors at Faith Lutheran High School received their diplomas in a "drive-thru" graduation ceremony alternative due to the impact of the COVID-19 pandemic.  Students  celebrated in a parade lap around the speedway course.

Notes

References

External links

 Las Vegas Motor Speedway Official Site
 Map and full circuit history at RacingCircuits.info
 
 
 Las Vegas Motor Speedway Page on NASCAR.com
 Jayski's Las Vegas Speedway Page – Current and Past Las Vegas Motor Speedway News
 High Resolution image from Google Maps
 Dream Racing at Las Vegas Motor Speedway
 Richard Petty Driving Experience at Las Vegas Motor Speedway
 Las Vegas Motor Speedway Tickets
 Exotics Racing at Las Vegas Motor Speedway

 
Champ Car circuits
IndyCar Series tracks
NASCAR tracks
NHRA Division 7 drag racing venues
Sports venues in Las Vegas
Motorsport venues in Nevada
Buildings and structures in Sunrise Manor, Nevada
American Le Mans Series circuits
IMSA GT Championship circuits
Tourist attractions in the Las Vegas Valley
Off-road racing venues in the United States
1972 establishments in Nevada
Sports venues completed in 1972